Ardeadoris carlsoni is a species of sea slug, a dorid nudibranch, a shell-less marine gastropod mollusc in the family Chromodorididae. It was transferred to the genus Ardeadoris on the basis of DNA evidence.

Distribution 
This species was described from Beqa Lagoon, Yanuca Island, Fiji, in the Western Pacific Ocean.

Description
Ardeadoris carlsoni has a pale, orange-yellow mantle with paler blotches. There is a white band at the edge of the mantle and a thin orange band at the very edge.

References

Chromodorididae
Gastropods described in 1986